William Rodney "Bird" Averitt (July 22, 1952December 12, 2020) was an American professional basketball player in the American Basketball Association (ABA) and the National Basketball Association (NBA). He won an ABA championship with the Kentucky Colonels in 1975.

Born in Hopkinsville, Kentucky, he played college basketball for the Pepperdine Waves and was named the conference player of the year in the West Coast Conference.  He was selected in the fourth round of the 1973 NBA draft by the Portland Trail Blazers and the second round of the 1973 ABA Draft by the San Diego Conquistadors.

He played for the San Antonio Spurs (1973–74) and Kentucky Colonels (1974–76) in the ABA for 236 games, winning the 1975 ABA championship with the Colonels.  After the Colonels were disbanded as part of the ABA–NBA merger, Averitt joined the Buffalo Braves through the 1976 ABA dispersal draft, playing with that team for the 1976–77 season until joining the New Jersey Nets for the 1977–78 season, playing 130 games in the NBA with those two teams.

Averitt died at age 68 on December 12, 2020.

ABA/NBA career statistics

Regular season 

|-
| style="text-align:left;"| 
| style="text-align:left;"|San Antonio (ABA)
| 74 || – || 22.1 || .376 || .180 || .696 || 1.6 || 1.8 || 0.9 || 0.1 || 11.5
|-
| style="text-align:left;background:#afe6fa;"|†
| style="text-align:left;"|Kentucky (ABA)
| 84 || – || 24.2 || .416 || .149 || .778 || 2.2 || 3.8 || 1.0 || 0.2 || 13.1
|-
| style="text-align:left;"| 
| style="text-align:left;"|Kentucky (ABA)
| 78 || – || 29.1 || .429 || .313 || .769 || 2.7 || 3.8 || 1.4 || 0.3 || 17.9
|-
| style="text-align:left;"| 
| style="text-align:left;"|Buffalo
| 75 || – || 15.1 || .378 || – || .716 || 1.0 || 1.8 || 0.4 || 0.1 || 7.9
|-
| style="text-align:left;"| 
| style="text-align:left;"|New Jersey
| 21 || – || 19.5 || .367 || – || .800 || 1.6 || 3.2 || 0.8 || 0.0 || 8.3
|-
| style="text-align:left;"| 
| style="text-align:left;"|Buffalo
| 34 || – || 19.9 || .436 || – || .667 || 1.5 || 3.8 || 0.6 || 0.2 || 9.5
|- class="sortbottom"
| style="text-align:center;" colspan="2"| Career
| 366 || – || 22.3 || .405 || .249 || .743 || 1.9 || 2.9 || 0.9 || 0.2 || 12.1

Playoffs 

|-
|style="text-align:left;"|1974
|style="text-align:left;”|San Antonio (ABA)
|6||–||17.3||.373||.000||.789||1.8||0.3||0.2||0.7||8.8
|-
| style="text-align:left;background:#afe6fa;"|1975†
|style="text-align:left;”|Kentucky (ABA)
|14||–||18.9||.364||.200||.806||1.6||2.1||0.5||0.0||9.9
|-
|style="text-align:left;"|1976
|style="text-align:left;”|Kentucky (ABA)
|10||–||35.8||.404||.154||.881||2.2||6.1||1.2||0.2||19.9
|- class="sortbottom"
| style="text-align:center;" colspan="2"| Career
| 30 || – || 24.2 || .385 || .143 || .837 || 1.8 || 3.1 || 0.7 || 0.2 || 13.0

See also
List of NCAA Division I men's basketball season scoring leaders

References

External links 

1952 births
2020 deaths
20th-century African-American sportspeople
21st-century African-American people
African-American basketball players
American men's basketball players
Basketball players from Kentucky
Buffalo Braves players
Kentucky Colonels players
New Jersey Nets players
Pepperdine Waves men's basketball players
Portland Trail Blazers draft picks
San Antonio Spurs players
San Diego Conquistadors draft picks
Shooting guards
Sportspeople from Hopkinsville, Kentucky